Thomas Eugene Hilgendorf (March 10, 1942 – March 25, 2021) was an American professional baseball player. He was a Major League relief pitcher for the St. Louis Cardinals, Cleveland Indians and Philadelphia Phillies in 1969–1970 and 1972–1975.

Playing career
Tom Hilgendorf was signed by the Cardinals as a free agent in 1960 after attending St. Mary's High School in Clinton, Iowa. It took until 1969 for him to make it to the major leagues when the Cardinals brought him up from the minors as a 27-year-old rookie. The left-hander made his debut against Atlanta.

The following year, he was involved in the infamous Ten Cent Beer Night on June 4, 1974, and was hit by a steel folding chair thrown by one of the drunk fans who took part in the riot that ended the Indians game in a forfeit. The next night he came on in relief in the Indians' rout of the Texas Rangers.

Hilgendorf died on March 25, 2021, at the age of 79 at the University of Iowa Hospitals and Clinics in Iowa City, Iowa.

References

External links

1942 births
2021 deaths
Cleveland Indians players
Philadelphia Phillies players
St. Louis Cardinals players
Winnipeg Goldeyes players
Lancaster Red Roses players
Arkansas Travelers players
Jacksonville Suns players
Omaha Royals players
Keokuk Cardinals players
Charleston Charlies players
Tulsa Oilers (baseball) players
Dothan Cardinals players
Major League Baseball pitchers
People from Clinton, Iowa
Baseball players from Iowa
American expatriate baseball players in Nicaragua